Francisque Arban, also known as Francesco Arban di Lione (1815 – disappeared 7 October 1849), was a French balloonist. In 1849, he was the first person to cross the Alps in a balloon, a feat not repeated until 1924. He disappeared over the Mediterranean Sea in 1849.

Biography
Arban was born in Lyons, one of the ten children of Simon Arban, artificier. A younger brother was the cornetist Jean-Baptiste Arban.

He made several balloon flights starting in 1832, but mostly in Italy between 1845 and 1849. He made his twelfth flight from Rome in April 1846, and he was rescued from the sea after a flight from Trieste later in 1846.

He is best known for his hydrogen balloon flight in 1849, crossing the Alps from Marseilles to Turin.

Disappearance
He took off on a balloon flight from Barcelona on 7 October 1849, but his balloon was blown over the Mediterranean Sea. He disappeared without trace, and is thought to have died shortly afterwards, however many newspapers reported in November 1853, that he had allegedly survived, being captured and in slavery for two years before escaping. The Illustrated London News said, "The Spanish journals state the French aeronaut, Arban, who made an ascent from Barcelona more than two years ago, and had not since been heard of, and who was believed to have fallen into the sea and been drowned, has made his appearance again. An Alicant letter says that his balloon went over to Africa, and that he was seized and made a slave, and continued in that state for two years, when he effected his escape."

See also
 List of people who disappeared mysteriously at sea

References

External links
 Francisque Arban, aéronaute français, Library of Congress
 Francesco Arban di Lione, Library of Congress
 Francisque Arban, French balloonist, Science Photo Library
 Francisque Arban 
 Les Aviateurs du département du Rhône

1815 births
1840s missing person cases
1849 deaths
Aviators from Lyon
French balloonists
Missing aviators
People lost at sea
Victims of aviation accidents or incidents in 1849